Skidoo Nunatak is a nunatak rising to 935 m, 1.3 nautical miles (2.4 km) south-southeast of Nodwell Peaks on Nordenskjold Coast, Graham Land. Named by United Kingdom Antarctic Place-Names Committee (UK-APC) following geological work by British Antarctic Survey (BAS), 1978–79, and in association with the names of pioneers of overland mechanical transport grouped in this area. Named after the Bombardier Ski-doo snowmobile used extensively by BAS since 1976.

Nunataks of Graham Land
Nordenskjöld Coast